Central High School was founded in Georgetown, Guyana, in 1927 by Joseph Clement Luck, and became the largest private educational establishment in the country, providing both primary and secondary education.

In September 2019, it was announced that Central High was being merged with St. Mary's High School, to become "The New Central High School". 
However, this was subsequently explained as a temporary merger that was being taken because of issues connected with the condition of the school's former building, and reassurances were given by the Regional Education Officer that the school's current "A"-grade status would be retained while phasing out St Mary's High School.

Notable alumni
 Brindley Benn
 Hilton Cheong-Leen
 Tommy Eytle
 Roy A. K. Heath
 Ralph Ramkarran
 Doris Rogers
 Doodnauth Singh

See also
List of schools in Guyana

References

Educational institutions established in 1927
1927 establishments in British Guiana
High schools and secondary schools in Guyana
Buildings and structures in Georgetown, Guyana